Per Olof Söderman (born 29 October 1932) is a former international speedway rider from Sweden. During his racing career he was also known as Peo Söderman.

Speedway career 
Söderman reached the final of the Speedway World Championship on four occasions in the 1956 Individual Speedway World Championship, 1957 Individual Speedway World Championship, 1963 Individual Speedway World Championship and 1966 Individual Speedway World Championship. He was also a two time finalist at the Individual Speedway Long Track World Championship in 1965 and 1970.

He rode in the top tier of British Speedway from 1956-58, riding for Coventry Bees.

World Final appearances

Individual World Championship
 1956 -  London, Wembley Stadium - 6th - 10pts
 1957 -  London, Wembley Stadium - 9th - 7pts
 1958 -  London, Wembley Stadium - Reserve - Did not ride
 1963 -  London, Wembley Stadium - 12th - 5pts
 1966 -  Gothenburg, Ullevi - 16th - 1pt

World Team Cup
 1963 -  Vienna, Stadion Wien (with Ove Fundin / Björn Knutsson / Göte Nordin / Rune Sörmander) - Winner - 37pts (10)

References 

1932 births
Living people
Swedish speedway riders
Coventry Bees riders